The San Francisco Peninsula is a peninsula in the San Francisco Bay Area that separates San Francisco Bay from the Pacific Ocean. On its northern tip is the City and County of San Francisco. Its southern base is Mountain View, south of Palo Alto and north of Sunnyvale and Los Altos. Most of the Peninsula is occupied by San Mateo County, between San Francisco and Santa Clara counties, and including the cities and towns of Atherton, Belmont, Brisbane, Burlingame, Colma, Daly City, East Palo Alto, El Granada, Foster City, Hillsborough, Half Moon Bay, La Honda, Loma Mar, Los Altos, Menlo Park, Millbrae, Pacifica, Palo Alto, Pescadero, Portola Valley, Redwood City, San Bruno, San Carlos, San Mateo, South San Francisco, and Woodside.

Whereas the term peninsula in a geographical sense technically refers to the entire San Francisco Peninsula, in local jargon, "The Peninsula" does not include the city of San Francisco.

History
In 1795, Governor Diego de Borica gave José Darío Argüello a Spanish land grant known as Rancho de las Pulgas.

As a local geographic term, the area referred to as "the Peninsula" is distinct from that denoted by "the City", and refers to the portion south of San Francisco. The appellation may date to the period prior to 1856, when the City of San Francisco and the County of San Francisco were separate entities, the latter then coextensive with contemporary San Mateo County and San Francisco City-County.  The City-County owns several disjunct properties along the whole of the Peninsula (mostly water pumping stations connected to the Hetch Hetchy Valley on which San Francisco has a permanent leasehold) – thus, most of the larger communities in San Mateo County are de facto suburbs of San Francisco, with the neighboring communities of Pacifica, Daly City, Broadmoor, Colma, South San Francisco, Half Moon Bay, San Bruno, and Brisbane being immediate suburbs.  The remaining suburban area of the Peninsula is on the east side of the Santa Cruz Mountains, along San Francisco Bay; the west and south-central portions of the Peninsula are mostly rural, unincorporated, and unorganized areas.

A substantial portion of Silicon Valley is located on the peninsula. In Silicon Valley are the headquarters of some of the largest tech companies in the world, such as Google, Yahoo, Facebook, and Apple. Since 2010, droughts and wildfires have increased in frequency and become less seasonal and more year-round, further straining the region's water security.

Geography and transportation

Along the center line of the Peninsula is the northern half of the Santa Cruz Mountains, formed by the action of plate tectonics along the San Andreas Fault. In the middle of the Peninsula along the fault is the Crystal Springs Reservoir. Just north of the Crystal Springs reservoir is San Andreas Lake, after which the geologic fault was originally named.

The east side of the peninsula is a densely populated and largely urban and suburban area that includes portions of Silicon Valley. It forms a commuter area between San Francisco to the north and San Jose to the south.

Roads

  Interstate 80
  Interstate 280
  Interstate 380
  U.S. Route 101
  State Route 1
  State Route 9
  State Route 35
  State Route 82
  State Route 84
  State Route 85
  State Route 92
  State Route 109
  State Route 114
  State Route 237

The bridges in the Peninsula include the Dumbarton Bridge, the Golden Gate Bridge, the San Francisco - Oakland Bay Bridge, and the San Mateo-Hayward Bridge.

A number of major thoroughfares run north-south: El Camino Real (SR 82) and US 101 on the east side along the bay, Interstate 280 down the center, Skyline Boulevard (SR 35) along the crest of the Santa Cruz Mountains, and SR 1 on the west along the Pacific, and SR 85 which forms the southern end of the Peninsula.

Transit 
Caltrain is the primary passenger rail transit in the peninsula, serving much of the eastern urbanized areas of the peninsula between Mountain View (which also connects to VTA light rail) and San Francisco's 4th and King Street stationIn addition, the peninsula has access to Bay Area Rapid Transit (BART) northward of Millbrae, connecting San Mateo County and San Francisco to the East Bay through a route over and under Daly City, Glen Park, San Francisco's Mission district, and through part of Market Street subway. 

Bus service is predominantly served by SamTrans and the SFMTA's Muni buses, predominantly serving San Mateo and San Francisco counties respectively. In addition, southward of Palo Alto, the Santa Clara Valley Transportation Authority operates buses to other parts of Santa Clara County. Most of the peninsula's bus transit to the East Bay and North Bay flowing through San Francisco, as neither AC Transit nor Golden Gate Transit, the primary transit operators for the East and North Bay respectively, do not serve the peninsula south of San Francisco.

Airports 
The peninsula's sole commercial airport is San Francisco International Airport, itself connected to US 101 and BART. Access to the two other major commercial airports within the Bay Area, Oakland and San Jose, requires usage of BART or the VTA.

Environmental features
The San Francisco Peninsula contains a variety of habitats including estuarine, marine, oak woodland, redwood forest, coastal scrub and oak savanna. There are numerous species of wildlife present, especially along the San Francisco Bay estuarine shoreline, San Bruno Mountain, Fitzgerald Marine Reserve and the forests on the Montara Mountain block.

The county is home to several endangered species including the San Francisco garter snake, the Mission blue butterfly and the San Bruno elfin butterfly, all of which are endemic to San Mateo County. The endangered California clapper rail is also found on the shores of San Francisco Bay, in the cities of Belmont and San Mateo.

A number of noteworthy parks and nature preserves are found on the San Francisco Peninsula, including:

 Edgewood Park, San Mateo County
 Golden Gate National Recreation Area - several units are located on the Peninsula
 Midpeninsula Regional Open Space District - several preserves
 Shoreline Park, Mountain View, Santa Clara County

Notable structures
There are a number of well-known structures and complexes on the San Francisco Peninsula:

 Bay Meadows Racecourse, San Mateo (demolished in 2008)
 Carolands Mansion, Hillsborough
 Cow Palace, Daly City
 Crocker Mansion, Hillsborough
 Crystal Springs Reservoir, west of Interstate 280
 CuriOdyssey museum, San Mateo
 Dakin Building, Brisbane
 Meta Platforms, world headquarters, Menlo Park
 Filoli mansion and gardens, Woodside
 Frenchman's Tower, Palo Alto
 Google Inc., World Headquarters, Mountain View
 "The Flintstone House", east side of Interstate 280
 Notre Dame de Namur University, Belmont, with Ralston Hall
 Oracle World Headquarters, Redwood Shores (aka the "Emerald City")
 Pulgas Water Temple, Woodside
 San Francisco International Airport
 Sanchez Adobe Park, Pacifica
 Stanford University campus, Palo Alto

See also

 
 List of peninsulas

References

External links
 

Peninsulas of California
Landforms of the San Francisco Bay Area
Geography of San Francisco
Geography of San Mateo County, California
Geography of Santa Clara County, California
Regions of California